ArrayFire is an American software company that develops programming tools for parallel computing and graphics on graphics processing unit (GPU) chipsets. Its products are particularly popular in the defense industry.

Products
The company's first major product was Jacket, a library that extends MATLAB with GPGPU capabilities on CUDA-enabled Nvidia GPUs, released in June 2008 (version 1.0 in January 2009).

Jacket was followed by ArrayFire, a similar GPGPU extension for C, C++ and Fortran. There are three versions available, one for CUDA GPUs, one for OpenCL devices and another for regular CPUs.

ArrayFire is partially funded by DARPA, who uses it in its "Memex" dark web search software.

Since version 3.4 the library is Open Source.

References

External links

 

Nvidia
American companies established in 2007
Software companies based in Georgia (U.S. state)
GPGPU
Companies based in Atlanta
Technology companies of the United States
Software companies of the United States
2007 establishments in Georgia (U.S. state)
Software companies established in 2007